Canadian Football League records include:

Regular Season:
List of Canadian Football League records (individual)
List of Canadian Football League records (team)